Susanna Kaysen (born November 11, 1948) is an American author, best known for her 1993 memoir Girl, Interrupted.

Background
Kaysen was born and raised in Cambridge, Massachusetts. She is the daughter of Annette (Neutra) and economist Carl Kaysen, a professor at MIT and former advisor to President John F. Kennedy. Her family is Jewish.

Kaysen attended high school at the Commonwealth School in Boston, and The Cambridge School of Weston, before being sent to McLean Hospital in 1967 to undergo psychiatric treatment for depression. While there, she was diagnosed with borderline personality disorder. She was released after 18 months. She drew on this experience for her memoir Girl, Interrupted in 1993, which was adapted into a film; she was portrayed by actress Winona Ryder.

Kaysen has one sister and is divorced. She lived for a time in the Faroe Islands, upon which experience her novel Far Afield is based.

Bibliography
Asa, As I Knew Him, 1987, 
Far Afield, 1990, 
Girl, Interrupted, 1993, 
The Camera My Mother Gave Me, 2001, 
Cambridge, 2014,

References

External links

 Austin Chronicle interview with Kaysen, via the Wayback Machine
 Susanna Kaysen author profile at Penguin Random House

1948 births
Living people
20th-century American memoirists
American women novelists
Writers from Boston
People with borderline personality disorder
20th-century American novelists
American women memoirists
20th-century American women writers
Commonwealth School alumni
Novelists from Massachusetts
McLean Hospital patients
21st-century American women
Jewish American writers